Talbot Trail Public School is a public elementary school in Windsor, Ontario.  Built in 2005 to ease overcrowding at neighbouring elementary schools, Talbot Trail is known for being the first of several planned "themed" schools to be built in Ontario, and the school's theme of exploration led it to be honoured as one of the Top 25 Schools in Canada by a 2007 edition of Today's Parent magazine.

History
During the 1990s, a housing boom in Windsor lead to rapidly rising enrollment in the region, particularly in elementary schools.  By 2000, the problem had become critical, with several area schools housing hundreds more students than their designs called for, and elementary students being temporarily moved to area high schools to ease overcrowding.  Consultations with parents and students identified the need for additional schools in the area, and in 2005 these demands culminated with the announcement of Talbot Trail Public School.

The groundbreaking, presided over by Windsor mayor Eddie Francis, was financed by issuing $50 million in debt, part of which was also earmarked for Lakeshore Discovery School.  Construction took only a single year, coming in both on-time and under-budget, and the first classes were held in the September 2006, 228 students came from Roseland Public School, and more from other schools.  The school was the first of several "themed" schools to be built in Essex County; Talbot Trail's was designed by Windsor architects Archon Architect Incorporated was inspired by the idea of "exploration".  Called "inspirational" by Today's Parent magazine, the interior of Talbot Trail features a Viking long ship, stonework emulating the Earth's layers, and fiber-optic constellations in the library. The school is also two floors high. Talbot Trail contains an elevator, just like Ecole Ste-Therese also in Windsor, Ontario.

Athletics

The school has many sports teams such as basketball, track and field, cross-country, badminton, soccer (association football), floor hockey, volleyball and more.

The Talbot Trail Novice Girls' cross country team placed 1st in the Cheswick division in 2007.
The Junior Girls' cross country team also placed 2nd at the same meet, and 3rd at the GECDSB championship meet in Lakeside Park, Kingsville.

The girls' Volleyball team were the city champs in 2007, as well in 2008, and placed 4th at a district tournament.

The girls' 9 yr. old 100m relay team placed 1st in 2006.

Track and Field District Champions 2011.

Community involvement
The school is sometimes involved in fundraising activities, such as a Food Drive when the school raises cans and boxes with food from students and teachers and donates them to the poor.  The school also has student parliament.

References

The school has 2 floors, and Smart Boards in every classroom.

External links
Talbot Trail Public School
Greater Essex County District School Board
The school's Twitter

Elementary schools in Windsor, Ontario
Educational institutions established in 2006
2006 establishments in Ontario